The an-Nāranj Pool is a small pool in the al-Aqsa Mosque Compound. It is at the compound's western esplanade, between the Fountain of Qasim Pasha and the Fountain of Qayt Bay (to its south). 

It was built in the Ottoman period. 
It was restored during the reign of Sultan Qaitbay and again in 1527 by Qasim Pasha, a governor of Jerusalem. In 1922, the Supreme Muslim Council reconstructed the pool, paved it with marble and encircled it with banisters. The pool is seven metres wide.

References

Temple Mount
Fountains in Israel